"Me & U" is the debut single by American singer Cassie. It was released on April 25, 2006, as the lead single from her self-titled debut album (2006). Written and produced by Ryan Leslie, the song reached number three on the U.S. Billboard Hot 100 and remained in the top forty for nearly five months.

The song's "Bad Boy" remix features Diddy and Yung Joc and the song's "The Inc" remix features Ja Rule and Harry-O. The single has been a successful debut as a top three single in the U.S., a top five single in New Zealand, a top ten hit in the United Kingdom, Ireland, and France, and a top twenty song in Australia. The song was considered "a slinky, vintage-sounding track with a hypnotic, snake-charming whistle," and likened to imitating Janet Jackson. According to Billboard, the song is about sex. The song is performed in the key of G minor with a tempo of 100 beats per minute.

The single was certified platinum by the Recording Industry Association of America on December 14, 2006. It was also certified platinum by the British Phonographic Industry.

Music video
In the music video, Cassie comes in at the dance studio with her MP3 which is playing part of the chorus to "Me & U" while improvising some lyrics that were not in the original song. She puts the song on and begins to dance and sing along, hurting herself while doing a spinning move, changing her different outfit and then being able to successfully complete the spinning move later on. The video is directed by Ray Kay.

The video was inspired by Janet Jackson's "The Pleasure Principle" video, described as evoking Jackson's "impromptu solo dance rehearsal" during the video's mirror scenes. Cassie stated "I'm a diehard Janet Jackson fan. A lot of people compare my video for "Me & U" to hers for "Pleasure Principle." "I was just rehearsing in the studio, they filmed me and the record label thought it would be great for the video. I'd love to emulate her career. She's incredible, from her moves to her voice."

In July 2006 an unreleased, low-budget and suggestive video for "Me & U" appeared on YouTube. This video was in stark contrast to the more polished video that was shown on mainstream media outlets. Initially, it was removed from most websites but continued to appear on file sharing networks and eventually appeared again on the internet. Cassie has gone on record to denounce the original video (directed by Little X), which depicts her singing to an unidentified man at a nightclub before taking him to a hotel room where Cassie is depicted kneeling below him while caressing his genital area and then unbuckling his pants in night vision. Cassie's management maintains that the low-budget, risqué version was released only for international audiences.

Chart performance
The single became Cassie's most popular single to date, peaking at number three on the Billboard Hot 100 for four consecutive weeks from July 22 to August 12, 2006. It was held off the top spot by "Promiscuous" by Nelly Furtado featuring Timbaland and "Crazy" by Gnarls Barkley which locked up the top two spots while "Me & U" was in third place. "Me & U" reached the top of the Hot R&B/Hip-Hop Songs chart. In the UK, the song entered the UK Singles Chart at number 23 and, within a week's time, rose to a number six, remaining there for a week before dropping down to number nine. The song also did well around the rest of Europe, including France, Germany, and Ireland.

Charts

Weekly charts

Year-end charts

Decade-end charts

Certifications

Release history

References

2005 songs
2006 debut singles
Bad Boy Records singles
Atlantic Records singles
Cassie Ventura songs
Music videos directed by Ray Kay
Song recordings produced by Ryan Leslie
Songs written by Ryan Leslie